MNP can stand for:

 Manor Park railway station, a National Rail station in England
 2-methyl-2-nitrosopropane
 Microcom Networking Protocol, for modems
 MNP LLP (Meyers Norris Penny) - a Canadian accounting firm headquartered in Calgary, Alberta
 Mobile number portability, of telephone numbers
 National Museum, Poznań
 National Order Party (Milli Nizam Partisi), Turkey
 Netherlands Environmental Assessment Agency (Milieu en Natuur Planbureau)
 Northern Mariana Islands, in the Pacific